Rhostryfan railway station was the intermediate station on the Bryngwyn Branch of the North Wales Narrow Gauge Railways (NWNGR) and its successor the Welsh Highland Railway (WHR). At some time since closure, the station itself has been demolished.

Although the line from Tryfan Junction to Bryngwyn has been purchased by the Festiniog Railway Company, there are no immediate plans to reopen the line. In 2011  the trackbed of the line became a public footpath, although with the condition that this would not impede any reopening of the branch line in the future.

See also
 North Wales Narrow Gauge Railways

References

External links
 Welsh Highland History, The Bryngwyn Branch
 A Glimpse of the Early Days of the North Wales Narrow Gauge Railway

Disused railway stations in Gwynedd
Welsh Highland Railway
Railway stations in Great Britain opened in 1877
Railway stations in Great Britain closed in 1914
Llanwnda, Gwynedd